Lyndsey Gerd Gunnulfsen (born March 15, 1994), usually known by her stage name Lynn Gunn, is an American singer, songwriter and multi-instrumentalist. Gunn is best known for fronting the American rock band Pvris. She has also collaborated with artists such as Tonight Alive and A Loss for Words.

PVRIS 

Gunn is one of the founders of the electronic alternative rock band PVRIS (pronounced "Paris") in 2012, which was then named Operation Guillotine, started in 2009. By 2013, Gunn had replaced Kyle Anthony as lead vocalist and guitarist. For legal reasons, the name of the band was officially changed to Pvris on July 26, 2013.

In 2018, Gunn opened up about vocal issues which she had been struggling with during her recent tours, and stated that she was undergoing vocal coaching to relearn how to sing. Gunn had previously acknowledged difficulties with "vocal kinks" and apologized if she had not "seemed herself" during live shows. In a 2019 interview with Kerrang!, Gunn stated that she had visited several ENT doctors who found that there was nothing physically wrong with her, and she felt that she was dealing with psychological blocks which prevented her from singing.

Other work and collaborations 
She has collaborated with other bands and musicians as a singer and songwriter. In 2013, Gunn collaborated with American pop-punk band A Loss for Words on the single "Distance". She co-wrote two tracks for Dissonants, the 2016 album from Australian rock band Hands Like Houses. In 2017, she was featured on the track "Lose Myself" on  The Throes of Winter by Seven Lions, and on Circa Waves' album Different Creatures.

In 2016, it was rumoured that Gunn was going to collaborate on new music with her friend Jenna McDougall, frontwoman of the Australian rock band Tonight Alive. Gunn was featured on the single "Disappear" which appeared on Tonight Alive’s 2018 album Underworld

She briefly filled in for Katie Henderson of The Aces as a guitarist when the band was supporting 5 Seconds of Summer on their Meet You There Tour. In 2019, she collaborated with From Indian Lakes on the single "Did We Change".

Personal life 
Lyndsey Gunnulfsen grew up in Lowell, Massachusetts. She has spoken about her lifelong fascination with graveyards, death, and the occult, stating that this was the inspiration behind many of the paranormal and macabre themes in her song-writing. Spiritually, she has said she is "into astrology and life paths and weird energetics stuff". Gunn has stated that she has struggled with depression, and that this was a major inspiration for much of her song-writing. Gunn has also cited bands such as Paramore, Radiohead, Florence and the Machine, and The Weeknd as musical influences. Lynn Gunn is a graduate from Lowell High School. Participating in Battle of The Bands at the school with some fellow classmates, she graduated in 2012, was originally going to attend MassArt but ultimately backed out to pursue PVRIS as a full-time project, prior to touring and signing to Rise Records, Gunn has spent some time working at Hot Topic and Guitar Center.

Public image and LGBT activism 
Gunn is a prominent LGBT voice in the alternative music scene. She stated in an interview for Rolling Stone that she first came out as gay to her parents when she was 18, by leaving a letter under her mother's pillow before she went on tour. "First and foremost I want to be known as is an artist and creative before anything else," she explained in an interview with Playboy. "I think my sexuality is the last thing to check off on that list." Gunn explained her decision to be vocal about her sexuality in an interview with Newsbeat in 2015: "I never had someone to look up to and be like 'oh that person is OK and they're gay.' If I can be that for someone then it's why I'm open about it."
 
Gunn was one of several artists invited by GLAAD and Billboard to talk about her coming-out story for National Coming Out Day in 2017. Gunn cited her family's supportiveness while she was coming out and encouraged others to reach out for the support around them.
 
Gunn presented the Icon Award to Laura Jane Grace of the American punk rock band Against Me! at the 2017 APMA Awards.

Discography

Studio albums with Pvris
White Noise (2014)
All We Know of Heaven, All We Need of Hell (2017)
Use Me (2020)

Extended plays with Pvris

Other songs with Pvris

Featured tracks

Awards and nominations

References

External links 

1994 births
American rock songwriters
American women singer-songwriters
American lesbian musicians
American LGBT singers
People from Lowell, Massachusetts
American women pop singers
American women rock singers
Living people
21st-century American women singers
21st-century American singers
20th-century American LGBT people
21st-century LGBT people